FC VPK-Ahro is a Ukrainian professional club from Shevchenkivka, Novomoskovsk Raion. It is currently playing in the Ukrainian First League, the second tier of Ukrainian football, following promotion from the 2019–20 Ukrainian Second League.

Until 2019, it has competed in the regional competitions of Dnipropetrovsk Oblast and Ukrainian amateur competitions. 

In 2013–2014, the club was based out of Dnipro playing at Molodizhny Park Stadium.

History
The club was founded in 2010 and sponsored by local agrarian company VPK-Ahro, hence the club's name. The club's president Volodymyr Korsun used to play for the club's predecessor FC Druzhba Mahdalynivka.

In 2013, the club along with another club from Dnipro, FC Pobieda Dnipro, fielded a joint team Pobieda–VPK-Ahro in regional competitions for a season, but it did not perform well.

Honours
Ukrainian Second League
 Winners (1): 2019–20

Football championship of Dnipropetrovsk Oblast
 Winners (3): 2014, 2016, 2018
 Runners-up (2): 2015, 2017

Football cup of Dnipropetrovsk Oblast
 Winners (1): 2017
 Runners-up (1): 2012, 2017

Players

League and cup history
{|class="wikitable"
|-bgcolor="#efefef"
! Season
! Div.
! Pos.
! Pl.
! W
! D
! L
! GS
! GA
! P
!Domestic Cup
!colspan=2|Other
!Notes
|-
| align="center" |2012–2014
| align="center" colspan=13|regional competitions (Dnipropetrovsk Oblast)
|-bgcolor=SteelBlue
| align="center" |2014
| align="center" rowspan=2|4th "3"
| align="center" |3
| align="center" |6
| align="center" |2
| align="center" |2
| align="center" |2
| align="center" |5
| align="center" |8
| align="center" |8
| align="center" |
| align="center" |UAC
| align="center" | finals
| align="center" |First stage
|-bgcolor=SteelBlue
| align="center" |2015
| align="center" |4
| align="center" |6
| align="center" |1
| align="center" |1
| align="center" |4
| align="center" |5
| align="center" |13
| align="center" |4
| align="center" |
| align="center" |
| align="center" |
| align="center" |First stage
|-
| align="center" |2015–2018
| align="center" colspan=13|regional competitions (Dnipropetrovsk Oblast)
|-bgcolor=SteelBlue
| align="center" rowspan=2|2018–19
| align="center" rowspan=2|4th "3"
| align="center" bgcolor=gold rowspan=2|1
| align="center" rowspan=2|22
| align="center" rowspan=2|16
| align="center" rowspan=2|5
| align="center" rowspan=2|1
| align="center" rowspan=2|60
| align="center" rowspan=2|12
| align="center" rowspan=2|53
| align="center" rowspan=2|
| align="center" rowspan=2|UAC
| align="center" rowspan=2| finals
| align="center" bgcolor=gold|Play-offs – Winner
|-bgcolor=SteelBlue
| align="center" bgcolor=lightgreen|Admitted to SL
|-bgcolor=PowderBlue
| align="center" |2019–20
| align="center" |3rd "B"
| align="center" bgcolor=gold|1
| align="center" |20
| align="center" |15
| align="center" |3
| align="center" |2
| align="center" |47
| align="center" |15
| align="center" |48
| align="center" | finals
| align="center" |
| align="center" |
| align="center" bgcolor=lightgreen|Promoted
|-bgcolor=LightCyan
| align="center" |2020–21
| align="center" |2nd
| align="center" |10
| align="center" |30
| align="center" |11
| align="center" |4
| align="center" |15
| align="center" |30
| align="center" |48
| align="center" |37
| align="center" | finals
| align="center" |
| align="center" |
| align="center" |
|}

Coaches
 2013 – 2013 Serhiy Taranenko
 2014 – 2014 Yevhen Proshenko
 2015 – 2015 Yevhen Pronenko
 2016 – 2016 Serhiy Taranenko
 2017 – 2021 Serhiy Solovyov
 2021 Oleksandr Hrytsay
 2021 – present Oleksandr Poklonskyi

References

External links
 Official website 

 
Ukrainian First League clubs
Football clubs in Dnipropetrovsk Oblast
Association football clubs established in 2010
2010 establishments in Ukraine